Gregory Falco is an American inventor and researcher. Falco is a Professor at Johns Hopkins University. His work lies mainly in the area of cybersecurity research and its aerospace applications.

Life and career 
Falco earned his B.S. from Cornell University in 2010, M.S. from Columbia University in 2012. and Ph.D., from the Massachusetts Institute of Technology in 2018. He completed a predoctoral fellowship with the Cyber Security Project at Harvard University. His postdoctoral research was conducted at the Computer Science and Artificial Intelligence Laboratory (CSAIL) at Massachusetts Institute of Technology and at the Cyber Policy Center at Stanford University. Falco's PhD was funded by NASA’s Jet Propulsion Laboratory to develop an AI system to automatically enumerate threats to space mission systems.

He began his career at Accenture where he was an executive in the Strategy & Sustainability practice. While at Accenture, he lectured at Columbia University and taught a course on Smart Cities and the Evolution of Sustainability.

Falco's main area of work is aerospace security research. 

In 2018, his paper Cybersecurity Principles for Space Systems, which included recommendations to reduce the cyber risk of the emergent commercial space sector, was published in the Journal of Aerospace Information Systems. His work on the topic titled Job One For Space Force: Space Asset Cybersecurity was published by Harvard’s Belfer Center. He was listed in Forbes 30 Under 30 in Enterprise Technology for contributions to industrial control security with his company NeuroMesh, acquired by Meta Platforms in 2022.

In 2021, Falco joined the faculty at Johns Hopkins University as an Assistant Professor at their Institute for Assured Autonomy. Falco is the director of the Aerospace ADVERSARY Laboratory at Johns Hopkins University.

In 2022, he published a monograph co-authored with Eric Rosenbach on cyber risk management titled Confronting Cyber Risk: An Embedded Endurance Strategy for Cybersecurity. He was awarded a DARPA Young Faculty Award for his project Orbital Resilient Blockchain Interagent Transaction Service (ORBITS) Architecture: A Resilient, Zero-Trust Architecture for Hosted Payloads and Space Infrastructure as a Service. Falco is a member of the Space Systems Critical Infrastructure Working Group hosted by Cybersecurity and Infrastructure Security Agency.

In 2023, Falco discussed the 2023 Chinese balloon incident as an aerospace security expert with BBC News, Bloomberg News, Australian Broadcasting Corporation, Channel 4 and Vice Media.

References 

People associated with computer security
American inventors
Johns Hopkins University faculty
Living people
Year of birth missing (living people)